Kyle Douglas Muller (born October 7, 1997) is an American professional baseball pitcher for the Oakland Athletics of Major League Baseball (MLB). He was drafted by the Atlanta Braves in the second round of the 2016 MLB draft. He made his MLB debut in 2021 with the Braves and was traded to Athletics after the 2022 season.

Amateur career
Muller attended Jesuit College Preparatory School of Dallas in Dallas, Texas. He was a pitcher and outfielder. During his senior year he set the national record for strikeouts in a row with 24. He was named the Gatorade Baseball Player of the Year after going 8–0 with a  0.46 earned run average (ERA) and 133 strikeouts as a pitcher and hit .396 with 15 home runs and 52 runs batted in (RBI). Muller also played high school basketball.

Muller committed to the University of Texas at Austin to play college baseball for the Texas Longhorns.

Professional career

Atlanta Braves
The Atlanta Braves  selected Muller with the 44th pick of the 2016 MLB draft. He signed with the Braves, receiving a $2.5 million signing bonus, to forgo his commitment to Texas.

After signing, Muller was assigned to the GCL Braves, where he posted a 1-0 record with a 0.65 ERA in 27.2 innings pitched. In 2017, Muller pitched for the Danville Braves where he pitched to a 1-1 record and 4.15 ERA in 11 games started. He began the 2018 season with the Rome Braves, and was promoted to the Florida Fire Frogs on May 8. He joined the Mississippi Braves on August 6. In 25 starts between the three clubs, Muller went 11-3 with a 3.03 ERA and a 1.23 WHIP, while leading the league with 16 wild pitches. Muller spent the entire 2019 season with Mississippi. He had a 7-6 record and a 3.14 ERA in 22 starts.

Muller did not play in a game in 2020 due to the cancellation of the minor league season because of the COVID-19 pandemic. After the year, the Braves added Muller to their 40-man roster.

On June 16, 2021, Muller was promoted to the major leagues for the first time after Tucker Davidson was placed on the injured list. He made his MLB debut that day, pitching one inning and allowing two runs against the Boston Red Sox. He made his first career start on June 21 against the New York Mets, allowing 1 run over 4 innings during the 4-2 loss. On July 3, Muller was optioned back down to Triple-A Gwinnett. In 2021 with the Braves he was 2-4 with a 4.17 ERA in nine games (8 starts).

Oakland Athletics
On December 12, 2022, the Oakland Athletics acquired Muller from the Braves in a three-team trade in which the Atlanta Braves acquired Sean Murphy, the Brewers acquired William Contreras, Joel Payamps, and Justin Yeager, and the Athletics also acquired Manny Piña, Esteury Ruiz, Freddy Tarnok, and Royber Salinas.

References

External links

1997 births
Living people
Baseball players from Dallas
Jesuit College Preparatory School of Dallas alumni
Major League Baseball pitchers
Atlanta Braves players
Gulf Coast Braves players
Danville Braves players
Rome Braves players
Florida Fire Frogs players
Mississippi Braves players
Peoria Javelinas players
Gwinnett Stripers players